Kerala,  a state in Southern  India, has a network of 11 National Highways, 72 State Highways and many district roads.

Features

Kerala has  of roads, which accounts for 5.6% of India's total. Most of Kerala's west coast is accessible through the NH 66 (previously NH 17 and 47); and the eastern side is accessible through state highways. New projects for hill and coastal highways were recently announced under KIIFB. National Highway 66, with the longest stretch of road connects Kanyakumari to Mumbai; it enters Kerala via Talapady in Kasargod and passes through Kannur, Kozhikode, Malappuram, Guruvayur, Kochi, Alappuzha, Kollam, Thiruvananthapuram before entering Tamil Nadu. Palakkad district is generally referred to as the Gateway of Kerala, due to the presence of the Palakkad Gap in the Western Ghats, through which the northern (Malabar) and southern (Travancore) parts of Kerala are connected to the rest of India via road and rail. The state's largest checkpoint, Walayar, is on NH 544, in the border town between Kerala and Tamil Nadu, through which a large amount of public and commercial transportation reaches the northern and central districts of Kerala. Kottayam has the maximum length of roads among the districts of Kerala, while Wayanad accounts for minimum.

Distribution of roads
Agency-wise by distribution

†NHAI maintains 444.9 km and Kerala PWD (NH) section maintains rest of the National Highways from direction of MORTH

National highways

Kerala has eight National Highways which run for about 1811.52 km. Kerala has narrower National Highways compared to other parts of India. Kerala is the only state, other than Goa, which has requested for narrower highways in the state. NHAI upgrades highways to a minimum 4-lane, 60-meter-wide, grade-separated highway or a better standard across India. But in Kerala, National Highways are being upgraded to 45-meter-wide highways. Previous Kerala State Government had requested the NHAI to reduce the width of National highways in the state to 30-meters, although neighbouring Karnataka and Tamil Nadu are upgrading their National Highways as 60-meters or more wider highways, with futuristic provision for 6/8-lane highway. The reason cited by the State Government was the difficulty and disinterest in Land Acquisition, which is the responsibility of the State Government. NHAI had stopped working on many of the highway widening/upgrade projects as there are opposition from the local population for highway widening. Among Kerala's districts, Ernakulam has the maximum length of National Highway, which accounts for 172.76 km. Wayanad has the minimum length of National Highway in Kerala.

Government has taken steps to develop the NH 66 (Kasargod to Thiruvananthapuram) into six lane. But, proposed six lane highways with 45 m Right of Way in Kerala will not have the wide medians to help the trucks and large vehicles to take the U-Turn without blocking the high speed traffic, which is a common feature in other parts of India. Wider median also helps to block the opposite side vehicle headlamp with plants.

Six-laning of National Highways in Kerala
Kerala's first six lane National Highway is coming up on the  NH 544 between stretches of Thrissur and Vadakkencherry. The project is rescheduled to be completed by July 2021. Kerala's first and biggest six lane tunnel highway is also coming up on the stretch at Kuthiran. The work for the Kuthiran highway tunnel almost complete. It is the part of Kochi -Thrissur-Palakkad- Walayar stretch of four-lane NH 544

Bharatmala Pariyojana has identified 418 km of national highway and State highway stretches in Kerala. Keeping in view a futuristic approach, it has been decided that the land for any 4/6-lane highway road will be acquired with a right of way (RoW) of 60 m irrespective of the width of the carriageway.

Kerala has not been allocated Greenfield 8-lane access-controlled expressways like other south Indian states as part of Bharatmala Pariyojana, as many brownfield projects of NHDP projects have still not started.

The Palakkad—Thrissur—Kochi stretch of NH 544 is a part of North-South and East-West Corridor of the Indian highway system. Due to the previous land acquisition crisis, NHAI had also stopped the feasibility study of the project under NHDP–Phase-III scheme in the stretch of NH 66 earlier, but has begun again after the strict demand of present Chief Minister. There was a proposal for construction of standalone ring road/bypasses around Tiruvananthapuram City under NHDP Phase VII.

State highways

There are 72 state highways in Kerala. Of them, MC Road (Main-Central Road), proposed Hill Highway (Kerala) and Main Eastern Highway are the largest. The respective State Highway number is displayed on the top of all milestones (black in colour in green background) on the respective road.

The State Road Improvement Project (SRIP) envisages to improve and upgrade 1200 km of State Highways and Major District Roads to enhance the capacity and riding quality with proper maintenance plan, road safety and reducing the expenditure on periodic maintenance. The project is implemented by Road Infrastructure Company Kerala (RICK) Ltd. Road Infrastructure Company Kerala Limited (RICK) was incorporated in March 2012 as a Special Purpose Vehicle with paid up capital contributed by Government of Kerala (51%) and Kerala Road Fund Board (49%). About 29 road sections totalling to a length of 469 km has identified for rehabilitation improvements by the company. Rehabilitation project include strengthening/reconstruction of pavement/structure, junction improvements, provision of road furniture, bus bay byes and other traffic management measures. The company plans to upgrade 32 roads of 644 km. Upgrades involve widening the carriageway with paved shoulder (1.5 m on either side), widening of narrow CD works, geometric improvements, junction improvements, identifying the grade separation requirements, etc.

Sustainable and Planned Effort to Ensure Infrastructure Development (SPEEID) KERALA - Kerala government have formulated the project of constructing flyovers, bridges and roads at selected areas in the state in order to reduce the increasing traffic congestion. The project named as ‘SPEEID KERALA’ comprises 23 projects at the estimated cost of `10,000 Crore. The Kerala Road Fund Board (KRFB), the special purpose vehicle under the PWD, had been entrusted with the task of mobilizing funds for the projects. Work of 5 projects are in progress.

The Kerala State Transport Project, costing 336 million US dollars (Rs 1612 crores) - of which World Bank financing is US $255 million (Rs 1224 crores) and State's contribution is US $79.00 million(Rs 388 crores), aims to improve traffic flow and road safety on Kerala State's primary road network, and to strengthen the institutional and financial capacity of Kerala's key transport sector agencies. The  KSTP  was  designed  to  upgrade  581 km  and  cover  1000 km  under  maintenance  in two Phases.  However, due to several reasons including delay in land acquisition, only 254 km of Phase I road was upgraded and maintenance works for 1180 km were carried out from June 2002 and December 2009. The KSTP phase 2 envisages upgrading 363 km of SH and MDR, Road Safety Management and Institutional Strengthening of PWD.  The total Project cost is 445 million USD out of which 216 million USD is loan assistance from World Bank.

District-wise SH length of roads  

†Maintained by PWD (R&B) as on 31-3-2015

Major District Road

†Maintained by PWD (R&B) as in 2019-20

City roads
The government is planning to improve all the major city roads in Kerala. Roads in Thiruvananthapuram, Kollam, Alappuzha, Kottayam, Kozhikode,  Malappuram and Punalur city roads will get some major facelifts through this project.

See also
 Kerala Infrastructure Investment Fund Board
 Economy of Kerala

References

External links

 Kerala PWD Site
 NHAI